This page lists all described species of the spider family Araneidae as of Nov. 5, 2013, that start with letters G through M.

Galaporella 
Galaporella Levi, 2009
 Galaporella thaleri Levi, 2009 - Galapagos Is.

Gasteracantha 
Gasteracantha Sundevall, 1833
 Gasteracantha aciculata (Pocock, 1899) — New Britain
 Gasteracantha acutispina Dahl, 1914 — Sulawesi
 Gasteracantha audouini Guerin, 1838 — Sumatra, Timor, Amboina, Philippines
 Gasteracantha aureola Mi & Peng, 2013 — China
 Gasteracantha beccarii Thorell, 1877 — Sulawesi
 Gasteracantha biloba (Thorell, 1878) — Moluccas, Amboina
 Gasteracantha cancriformis (Linnaeus, 1758) (type species) — New World
 Gasteracantha cancriformis gertschi Archer, 1941 — USA
 Gasteracantha clarki Emerit, 1974 — Seychelles
 Gasteracantha clavatrix (Walckenaer, 1841) — Lombok, Sulawesi, Mentawai Islands
 Gasteracantha clavigera Giebel, 1863 — Thailand, Philippines, Sulawesi
 Gasteracantha crucigera Bradley, 1877 — Malaysia, Java, Borneo, New Guinea
 Gasteracantha curvispina (Guerin, 1837) — West, Central Africa, Bioko
 Gasteracantha curvistyla Dahl, 1914 — Togian Islands, near Sulawesi
 Gasteracantha cuspidata C. L. Koch, 1837 — Malaysia, Nicobar Islands, Java
 Gasteracantha dalyi Pocock, 1900 — India, Pakistan
 Gasteracantha diadesmia Thorell, 1887 — India to Philippines
 Gasteracantha diardi (Lucas, 1835) — China, Thailand, Malaysia, Borneo, Sunda Islands
 Gasteracantha doriae Simon, 1877 — Singapore, Sumatra, Borneo
 Gasteracantha falcicornis Butler, 1873 — Africa
 Gasteracantha fasciata Guerin, 1838 — New Guinea, Guam
 Gasteracantha flava Nicolet, 1849 — Chile
 Gasteracantha fornicata (Fabricius, 1775) — Queensland
 Gasteracantha frontata Blackwall, 1864 — India, Myanmar, Thailand, Flores, Borneo
 Gasteracantha gambeyi Simon, 1877 — New Caledonia
 Gasteracantha geminata (Fabricius, 1798) — India, Sri Lanka
 Gasteracantha hasselti C. L. Koch, 1837 — India, China to Moluccas
 Gasteracantha hecata (Walckenaer, 1841) — Philippines
 Gasteracantha interrupta Dahl, 1914 — Lombok, Sulawesi
 Gasteracantha irradiata (Walckenaer, 1841) — Thailand to Philippines, Sulawesi
 Gasteracantha janopol Barrion & Litsinger, 1995 — Philippines
 Gasteracantha kuhli C. L. Koch, 1837 — India to Japan, Philippines
 Gasteracantha lepelletieri (Guerin, 1825) — Sumatra to Philippines, New Guinea
 Gasteracantha lunata Guerin, 1838 — Timor, Moluccas, New Caledonia
 Gasteracantha martensi Dahl, 1914 — Sumatra
 Gasteracantha mediofusca (Doleschall, 1859) — Java, New Guinea
 Gasteracantha mengei Keyserling, 1864 — Malaysia, Sumatra, Borneo
 Gasteracantha metallica (Pocock, 1898) — Solomon Islands
 Gasteracantha milvoides Butler, 1873 — Central, East, Southern Africa
 Gasteracantha notata Kulczynski, 1910 — New Britain
 Gasteracantha panisicca Butler, 1873 — Myanmar to Philippines, Java
 Gasteracantha parangdiadesmia Barrion & Litsinger, 1995 — Philippines
 Gasteracantha pentagona (Walckenaer, 1841) — New Ireland, New Britain
 Gasteracantha pentagona anirica Strand, 1915 — Bismarck Archipel
 Gasteracantha picta (Thorell, 1892) — Singapore
 Gasteracantha quadrispinosa O. P.-Cambridge, 1879 — New Guinea, Queensland
 Gasteracantha recurva Simon, 1877 — Philippines
 Gasteracantha regalis Butler, 1873 — New Hebrides
 Gasteracantha remifera Butler, 1873 — India, Sri Lanka
 Gasteracantha rhomboidea Guerin, 1838 — Mauritius
 Gasteracantha rhomboidea comorensis Strand, 1917 — Comoro Islands
 Gasteracantha rhomboidea madagascariensis Vinson, 1863 — Madagascar
 Gasteracantha rubrospinis Guerin, 1838 — Lombok, Sulawesi, Moluccas, New Caledonia, Guam
 Gasteracantha rufithorax Simon, 1881 — Madagascar
 Gasteracantha sacerdotalis L. Koch, 1872 — New Guinea, Queensland, New Caledonia
 Gasteracantha sanguinea Dahl, 1914 — Philippines
 Gasteracantha sanguinolenta C. L. Koch, 1844 — Africa, Sao Tome, Yemen, Seychelles, Socotra
 Gasteracantha sanguinolenta andrefanae Emerit, 1974 — Madagascar
 Gasteracantha sanguinolenta bigoti Emerit, 1974 — Madagascar
 Gasteracantha sanguinolenta emeriti Roberts, 1983 — Aldabra
 Gasteracantha sanguinolenta insulicola Emerit, 1974 — Seychelles
 Gasteracantha sanguinolenta legendrei Emerit, 1974 — Europa Islands
 Gasteracantha sanguinolenta mangrovae Emerit, 1974 — Madagascar
 Gasteracantha sanguinolenta rueppelli (Strand, 1916) — Egypt
 Gasteracantha sapperi Dahl, 1914 — New Guinea
 Gasteracantha sauteri Dahl, 1914 — China, Taiwan
 Gasteracantha scintillans Butler, 1873 — Solomon Islands
 Gasteracantha signifera Pocock, 1898 — Solomon Islands
 Gasteracantha signifera bistrigella Strand, 1915 — Bismarck Archipel
 Gasteracantha signifera heterospina Strand, 1915 — Bismarck Archipel
 Gasteracantha signifera pustulinota Strand, 1915 — Bismarck Archipel
 Gasteracantha simoni O. P.-Cambridge, 1879 — Central Africa
 Gasteracantha sororna Butler, 1873 — India
 Gasteracantha sturi (Doleschall, 1857) — Laos, Sumatra, Java, Borneo, Moluccas
 Gasteracantha subaequispina Dahl, 1914 — Borneo, New Guinea
 Gasteracantha taeniata (Walckenaer, 1841) — India to Polynesia
 Gasteracantha taeniata analispina Strand, 1911 — New Guinea
 Gasteracantha taeniata anirensis Strand, 1911 — New Ireland
 Gasteracantha taeniata bawensis Strand, 1915 — New Guinea
 Gasteracantha taeniata jamurensis Strand, 1915 — New Guinea
 Gasteracantha taeniata lugubris Simon, 1898 — Solomon Islands
 Gasteracantha taeniata maculella Strand, 1911 — Aru Islands
 Gasteracantha taeniata novahannoveriana Dahl, 1914 — Bismarck Archipel
 Gasteracantha taeniata obsoletopicta Strand, 1915 — Indonesia
 Gasteracantha taeniata oinokensis Strand, 1915 — New Guinea
 Gasteracantha taeniata sentanensis Strand, 1915 — New Guinea
 Gasteracantha taeniata trivittinota Strand, 1911 — New Ireland
 Gasteracantha taeniata univittinota Strand, 1911 — New Ireland
 Gasteracantha theisi Guerin, 1838 — New Guinea, Moluccas
 Gasteracantha theisi antemaculata Strand, 1911 — Aru Islands
 Gasteracantha theisi keyana Strand, 1911 — Kei Islands
 Gasteracantha theisi quadrisignatella Strand, 1911 — Indonesia
 Gasteracantha thomasinsulae Archer, 1951 — Sao Tome
 Gasteracantha thorelli Keyserling, 1864 — Madagascar
 Gasteracantha tondanae Pocock, 1897 — Sulawesi
 Gasteracantha transversa C. L. Koch, 1837 — Sumatra, Java
 Gasteracantha unguifera Simon, 1889 — China, India
 Gasteracantha versicolor (Walckenaer, 1841) — Central, East, Southern Africa
 Gasteracantha versicolor avaratrae Emerit, 1974 — Madagascar
 Gasteracantha versicolor formosa Vinson, 1863 — Madagascar
 Gasteracantha westringi Keyserling, 1864 — Australia, Admiralty Islands, New Caledonia

Gastroxya
Gastroxya Benoit, 1962
 Gastroxya benoiti Emerit, 1973 — South Africa
 Gastroxya krausi Benoit, 1962 — Liberia, Congo
 Gastroxya leleupi Benoit, 1962 — Congo
 Gastroxya schoutedeni Benoit, 1962 (type species) — Congo, Rwanda, Burundi

Gea
Gea C. L. Koch, 1843
 Gea africana Simon, 1895 — Congo
 Gea argiopides Strand, 1911 — Aru Islands, New Guinea
 Gea bituberculata (Thorell, 1881) — New Guinea
 Gea eff Levi, 1983 — New Guinea, New Britain
 Gea heptagon (Hentz, 1850) — USA to Argentina, South Pacific Islands, Australia
 Gea infuscata Tullgren, 1910 — East Africa, Angola
 Gea nilotica Simon, 1906 — Egypt, Sudan
 Gea spinipes C. L. Koch, 1843 (type species) — India, China, Taiwan to Borneo
 Gea spinipes nigrifrons Simon, 1901 — Malaysia
 Gea subarmata Thorell, 1890 — India, Bangladesh to Philippines, New Guinea
 Gea theridioides (L. Koch, 1872) — Queensland, New South Wales
 Gea transversovittata Tullgren, 1910 — Congo, East Africa
 Gea zaragosa Barrion & Litsinger, 1995 — Philippines

Gibbaranea
Gibbaranea Archer, 1951
 Gibbaranea abscissa (Karsch, 1879) — Russia, China, Korea, Japan
 Gibbaranea bifida Guo, Zhang & Zhu, 2011 — China
 Gibbaranea bituberculata (Walckenaer, 1802) (type species) — Palearctic
 Gibbaranea bruuni Lissner, 2016 - Majorca, Portugal, Algeria, Tunisia 
 Gibbaranea gibbosa (Walckenaer, 1802) — Europe to Azerbaijan
 Gibbaranea gibbosa confinis (Simon, 1870) — Spain, Corsica
 Gibbaranea hetian (Hu & Wu, 1989) — China, Mongolia
 Gibbaranea indiana Roy, Saha & Raychaudhuri, 2015 -  India 
 Gibbaranea nanguosa Yin & Gong, 1996 — China
 Gibbaranea occidentalis Wunderlich, 1989 — Azores
 Gibbaranea omoeda (Thorell, 1870) — Palearctic
 Gibbaranea tenerifensis Wunderlich, 1992 — Canary Islands
 Gibbaranea ullrichi (Hahn, 1835) — Europe, Russia, Central Asia

Glyptogona
Glyptogona Simon, 1884
 Glyptogona duriuscula Simon, 1895 — Sri Lanka
 Glyptogona sextuberculata (Keyserling, 1863) (type species) — Italy to Israel

Gnolus 
 Gnolus Simon, 1879
 Gnolus angulifrons Simon, 1896 -  Chile, Argentina 
 Gnolus blinkeni Platnick & Shadab, 1993 -  Chile, Argentina 
 Gnolus cordiformis (Nicolet, 1849) (type species) -  Chile, Argentina 
 Gnolus limbatus (Nicolet, 1849) - Chile 
 Gnolus spiculator (Nicolet, 1849) -  Chile, Argentina 
 Gnolus zonulatus Tullgren, 1902 - Chile, Argentina

Herennia
Herennia Thorell, 1877
 Herennia agnarssoni Kuntner, 2005 — Solomon Islands
 Herennia deelemanae Kuntner, 2005 — Borneo
 Herennia etruscilla Kuntner, 2005 — Java
 Herennia gagamba Kuntner, 2005 — Philippines
 Herennia jernej Kuntner, 2005 — Sumatra
 Herennia milleri Kuntner, 2005 — New Guinea, New Britain
 Herennia multipuncta (Doleschall, 1859) — India to China, Borneo, Sulawesi
 Herennia oz Kuntner, 2005 — Northern Territory
 Herennia papuana Thorell, 1881 — New Guinea
 Herennia sonja Kuntner, 2005 — Kalimantan, Sulawesi
 Herennia tone Kuntner, 2005 — Philippines

Heterognatha
Heterognatha Nicolet, 1849
 Heterognatha chilensis Nicolet, 1849 — Chile

Heurodes
Heurodes Keyserling, 1886
 Heurodes fratrellus (Chamberlin, 1924) — China
 Heurodes porculus (Simon, 1877) — Singapore, Philippines
 Heurodes turritus Keyserling, 1886 (type species) — Tasmania

Hingstepeira
Hingstepeira Levi, 1995
 Hingstepeira arnolisei Levi, 1995 — Brazil
 Hingstepeira dimona Levi, 1995 — Brazil
 Hingstepeira folisecens (Hingston, 1932) (type species) — Colombia, Brazil, Guyana, Suriname, French Guiana
 Hingstepeira isherton Levi, 1995 — Guyana

Hypognatha
Hypognatha Guerin, 1839
 Hypognatha alho Levi, 1996 — Brazil
 Hypognatha belem Levi, 1996 — Brazil
 Hypognatha cacau Levi, 1996 — Peru, Brazil
 Hypognatha cambara Levi, 1996 — Brazil
 Hypognatha carpish Levi, 1996 — Peru
 Hypognatha colosso Levi, 1996 — Colombia, Brazil
 Hypognatha coyo Levi, 1996 — Colombia
 Hypognatha cryptocephala Mello-Leitao, 1947 — Brazil
 Hypognatha deplanata (Taczanowski, 1873) — Brazil, French Guiana
 Hypognatha divuca Levi, 1996 — Peru
 Hypognatha elaborata Chickering, 1953 — Costa Rica, Panama, Colombia
 Hypognatha furcifera (O. P.-Cambridge, 1881) — Brazil
 Hypognatha ica Levi, 1996 — Colombia, Brazil
 Hypognatha ituara Levi, 1996 — Brazil
 Hypognatha jacaze Levi, 1996 — Brazil
 Hypognatha janauari Levi, 1996 — Brazil
 Hypognatha lagoas Levi, 1996 — Brazil
 Hypognatha lamoka Levi, 1996 — Venezuela
 Hypognatha maranon Levi, 1996 — Peru
 Hypognatha maria Levi, 1996 — Peru
 Hypognatha matisia Levi, 1996 — Peru
 Hypognatha mirandaribeiroi Soares & Camargo, 1948 — Brazil
 Hypognatha mozamba Levi, 1996 — Colombia, Ecuador, Peru, Brazil
 Hypognatha nasuta O. P.-Cambridge, 1896 — Mexico
 Hypognatha navio Levi, 1996 — Venezuela, Brazil
 Hypognatha pereiroi Levi, 1996 — Brazil
 Hypognatha putumayo Levi, 1996 — Colombia, Ecuador
 Hypognatha rancho Levi, 1996 — Venezuela
 Hypognatha saut Levi, 1996 — French Guiana
 Hypognatha scutata (Perty, 1833) (type species) — Trinidad to Argentina
 Hypognatha solimoes Levi, 1996 — Brazil
 Hypognatha tampo Levi, 1996 — Peru
 Hypognatha testudinaria (Taczanowski, 1879) — Peru
 Hypognatha tingo Levi, 1996 — Peru
 Hypognatha tocantins Levi, 1996 — Brazil
 Hypognatha triunfo Levi, 1996 — Brazil
 Hypognatha utari Levi, 1996 — Brazil
 Hypognatha viamao Levi, 1996 — Brazil

Hypsacantha
Hypsacantha Dahl, 1914
 Hypsacantha crucimaculata (Dahl, 1914) — Central, East, Southern Africa

Hypsosinga
Hypsosinga Ausserer, 1871
 Hypsosinga alberta Levi, 1972 — Russia, Canada
 Hypsosinga alboria Yin et al., 1990 — China
 Hypsosinga albovittata (Westring, 1851) — Europe, North Africa, Russia, Ukraine
 Hypsosinga clax Oliger, 1993 — Russia
 Hypsosinga funebris (Keyserling, 1892) — USA, Canada
 Hypsosinga groenlandica Simon, 1889 — USA, Canada, Greenland
 Hypsosinga heri (Hahn, 1831) — Palearctic
 Hypsosinga kazachstanica Ponomarev, 2007 — Kazakhstan
 Hypsosinga lithyphantoides Caporiacco, 1947 — Uganda, Kenya
 Hypsosinga lithyphantoides dealbata Caporiacco, 1949 — Kenya
 Hypsosinga luzhongxiani Barrion, Barrion-Dupo & Heong, 2013 - China 
 Hypsosinga pygmaea (Sundevall, 1831) — Holarctic
 Hypsosinga pygmaea nigra (Simon, 1909) — Vietnam
 Hypsosinga pygmaea nigriceps (Kulczynski, 1903) — Turkey
 Hypsosinga rubens (Hentz, 1847) — USA, Canada
 Hypsosinga sanguinea (C. L. Koch, 1844) (type species) — Palearctic
 Hypsosinga satpuraensis Bodkhe, Uniyal & Kamble, 2016 -  India 
 Hypsosinga taprobanica (Simon, 1895) — Sri Lanka
 Hypsosinga turkmenica Bakhvalov, 1978 — Turkmenistan
 Hypsosinga vaulogeri (Simon, 1909) — Vietnam
 Hypsosinga wanica Song, Qian & Gao, 1996 — China

Ideocaira
Ideocaira Simon, 1903
 Ideocaira transversa Simon, 1903 (type species) — South Africa
 Ideocaira triquetra Simon, 1903 — South Africa

Isoxya
Isoxya Simon, 1885
 Isoxya basilewskyi Benoit & Emerit, 1975 — Rwanda, Congo
 Isoxya cicatricosa (C. L. Koch, 1844) (type species) — Central, East, Southern Africa, Yemen
 Isoxya cowani (Butler, 1882) — Madagascar
 Isoxya mahafalensis Emerit, 1974 — Madagascar
 Isoxya milloti Emerit, 1974 — Madagascar
 Isoxya mossamedensis Benoit, 1962 — Angola
 Isoxya mucronata (Walckenaer, 1841) — Central, Southern Africa
 Isoxya nigromutica (Caporiacco, 1939) — East Africa
 Isoxya penizoides Simon, 1887 — West, Central, East Africa
 Isoxya reuteri (Lenz, 1886) — Madagascar
 Isoxya semiflava Simon, 1887 — West, Central Africa
 Isoxya somalica (Caporiacco, 1940) — Somalia
 Isoxya stuhlmanni (Bösenberg & Lenz, 1895) — Central, East, Southern Africa
 Isoxya tabulata (Thorell, 1859) — Central, East, Southern Africa
 Isoxya testudinaria (Simon, 1901) — West, Central, East Africa
 Isoxya yatesi Emerit, 1973 — South Africa

Kaira
Kaira O. P.-Cambridge, 1889
 Kaira alba (Hentz, 1850) — USA, Mexico
 Kaira altiventer O. P.-Cambridge, 1889 — USA to Brazil
 Kaira candidissima (Mello-Leitao, 1941) — Argentina
 Kaira cobimcha Levi, 1993 — Brazil
 Kaira conica Gerschman & Schiapelli, 1948 — Brazil, Argentina
 Kaira dianae Levi, 1993 — Peru
 Kaira echinus (Simon, 1897) — Brazil, Argentina
 Kaira electa (Keyserling, 1883) — Brazil
 Kaira erwini Levi, 1993 — Peru
 Kaira gibberosa O. P.-Cambridge, 1890 (type species) — Mexico to Brazil
 Kaira hiteae Levi, 1977 — USA
 Kaira levii Alayón, 1993 — Cuba
 Kaira sabino Levi, 1977 — USA
 Kaira sexta (Chamberlin, 1916) — Guatemala to Brazil
 Kaira shinguito Levi, 1993 — Peru
 Kaira tulua Levi, 1993 — Colombia

Kapogea
Kapogea Levi, 1997
 Kapogea cyrtophoroides (F. O. P.-Cambridge, 1904) — Mexico to Peru, Bolivia, Brazil
 Kapogea isosceles (Mello-Leitao, 1939) — Greater Antilles, Panama to Argentina
 Kapogea sellata (Simon, 1895) (type species) — Greater Antilles, Costa Rica to Argentina
 Kapogea sexnotata (Simon, 1895) — Venezuela to Peru, Bolivia, Brazil

Kilima
Kilima Grasshoff, 1970
 Kilima conspersa Grasshoff, 1970 — Congo
 Kilima decens (Blackwall, 1866) (type species) — Central, East, Southern Africa, Seychelles
 Kilima griseovariegata (Tullgren, 1910) — Central, East Africa, Yemen

Larinia
Larinia Simon, 1874
 Larinia acuticauda Simon, 1906 — West Africa to Israel
 Larinia ambo Harrod, Levi & Leibensperger, 1991 — Ecuador, Peru
 Larinia assimilis Tullgren, 1910 — East Africa
 Larinia astrigera Yin et al., 1990 — China
 Larinia bharatae Bhandari & Gajbe, 2001 — India
 Larinia bifida Tullgren, 1910 — Central, East, Southern Africa, Seychelles
 Larinia bivittata Keyserling, 1885 — Brazil, Paraguay, Uruguay, Argentina, Chile
 Larinia blandula (Grasshoff, 1971) — West Africa
 Larinia bonneti Spassky, 1939 — Palearctic
 Larinia borealis Banks, 1894 — North America
 Larinia bossae Marusik, 1987 — Russia
 Larinia chloris (Audouin, 1826) — Turkey to Mozambique, India
 Larinia cyclera Yin et al., 1990 — China
 Larinia dasia (Roberts, 1983) — Aldabra
 Larinia delicata Rainbow, 1920 — Lord Howe Islands
 Larinia dinanea Yin et al., 1990 — China
 Larinia directa (Hentz, 1847) — USA to Brazil
 Larinia duchengcaii Barrion, Barrion-Dupo & Heong, 2013 -  China 
 Larinia elegans Spassky, 1939 — Austria to China
 Larinia emertoni Gajbe & Gajbe, 2004 — India
 Larinia famulatoria (Keyserling, 1883) — USA, Mexico
 Larinia fangxiangensis Zhu, Lian & Chen, 2006 — China
 Larinia jamberoo Framenau & Scharff, 2008 — New South Wales, Victoria, South Australia
 Larinia jaysankari Biswas, 1984 — India
 Larinia jeskovi Marusik, 1987 — Eastern Europe to Japan
 Larinia kampala (Grasshoff, 1971) — Uganda
 Larinia kanpurae Patel & Nigam, 1994 — India
 Larinia lampa Harrod, Levi & Leibensperger, 1991 — Peru, Bolivia
 Larinia lineata (Lucas, 1846) (type species) — Western Mediterranean
 Larinia liuae Yin & Bao, 2012 — China
 Larinia macrohooda Yin et al., 1990 — China
 Larinia madhuchhandae Biswas & Raychaudhuri, 2012 - Bangladesh 
 Larinia mandlaensis Gajbe, 2005 — India
 Larinia microhooda Yin et al., 1990 — China
 Larinia minor (Bryant, 1945) — Hispaniola
 Larinia montagui Hogg, 1914 — Australia, Lord Howe Islands, Norfolk Islands
 Larinia montecarlo (Levi, 1988) — Brazil, Argentina
 Larinia natalensis (Grasshoff, 1971) — South Africa
 Larinia neblina Harrod, Levi & Leibensperger, 1991 — Venezuela
 Larinia nolabelia Yin et al., 1990 — China
 Larinia obtusa (Grasshoff, 1971) — Congo
 Larinia onoi Tanikawa, 1989 — Japan
 Larinia parangmata Barrion & Litsinger, 1995 — Philippines
 Larinia phthisica (L. Koch, 1871) — Asia, Japan, Philippines, New Guinea, Australia
 Larinia pubiventris Simon, 1889 — Central Asia
 Larinia sekiguchii Tanikawa, 1989 — Russia, China, Japan
 Larinia strandi Caporiacco, 1941 — Ethiopia
 Larinia t-notata (Tullgren, 1905) — Brazil, Argentina
 Larinia tabida (L. Koch, 1872) — Sulawesi to Australia, New Caledonia
 Larinia tamatave (Grasshoff, 1971) — Madagascar
 Larinia teiraensis Biswas & Biswas, 2007 — India
 Larinia trifida Tullgren, 1910 — Central, East Africa
 Larinia triprovina Yin et al., 1990 — China
 Larinia tucuman Harrod, Levi & Leibensperger, 1991 — Argentina
 Larinia tyloridia Patel, 1975 — India
 Larinia vara Kauri, 1950 — South Africa
 Larinia wenshanensis Yin & Yan, 1994 — China

Lariniaria
Lariniaria Grasshoff, 1970
 Lariniaria argiopiformis (Bösenberg & Strand, 1906) — Russia, China, Korea, Japan

Larinioides
Larinioides Caporiacco, 1934
 Larinioides chabarovi (Bakhvalov, 1981) — Russia
 Larinioides cornutus (Clerck, 1757) — Holarctic
 Larinioides ixobolus (Thorell, 1873) — Palearctic
 Larinioides jalimovi (Bakhvalov, 1981) -  Russia, Korea 
 Larinioides patagiatus (Clerck, 1757) -  Holarctic 
 Larinioides sclopetarius (Clerck, 1757) — Holarctic
 Larinioides suspicax (O. P.-Cambridge, 1876) — Europe to Central Asia

Leviellus
Leviellus Wunderlich, 2004
 Leviellus caspica (Simon, 1889) — Central Asia
 Leviellus inconveniens (O. P.-Cambridge, 1872) — Lebanon, Israel
 Leviellus kochi (Thorell, 1870) (type species) — Southern Europe, North Africa, Central Asia
 Leviellus poriensis (Levy, 1987) -  Israel 
 Leviellus stroemi (Thorell, 1870) -  Palearctic
 Leviellus thorelli (Ausserer, 1871) — Europe

Lewisepeira
Lewisepeira Levi, 1993
 Lewisepeira boquete Levi, 1993 — Panama
 Lewisepeira chichinautzin Levi, 1993 — Mexico
 Lewisepeira farri (Archer, 1958) (type species) — Jamaica
 Lewisepeira maricao Levi, 1993 — Puerto Rico

Lipocrea
Lipocrea Thorell, 1878
 Lipocrea diluta Thorell, 1887 — Myanmar to Indonesia
 Lipocrea epeiroides (O. P.-Cambridge, 1872) — Greece, Cyprus, Turkey, Israel, Yemen, India
 Lipocrea fusiformis (Thorell, 1877) (type species) — India to Japan, Philippines, Sulawesi
 Lipocrea longissima (Simon, 1881) — Central, East, Southern Africa

Macracantha
Macracantha Simon, 1864
 Macracantha arcuata (Fabricius, 1793) — India, China to Borneo

Madacantha
Madacantha Emerit, 1970
 Madacantha nossibeana (Strand, 1916) — Madagascar

Mahembea
Mahembea Grasshoff, 1970
 Mahembea hewitti (Lessert, 1930) — Central, East Africa

Mangora
Mangora O. P.-Cambridge, 1889
 Mangora acalypha (Walckenaer, 1802) — Palearctic
 Mangora acaponeta Levi, 2005 — Mexico
 Mangora acoripa Levi, 2007 — Brazil
 Mangora acre Levi, 2007 — Colombia, Peru, Brazil
 Mangora alinahui Levi, 2007 — Ecuador, Bolivia, Brazil
 Mangora amacayacu Levi, 2007 — Colombia, Venezuela, Peru, Brazil
 Mangora amchickeringi Levi, 2005 — Panama, Colombia, Venezuela, Trinidad
 Mangora angulopicta Yin et al., 1990 — China
 Mangora anilensis Levi, 2007 — Brazil
 Mangora antillana Dierkens, 2012 — Martinique
 Mangora antonio Levi, 2007 — Brazil
 Mangora apaporis Levi, 2007 — Colombia, Peru
 Mangora apobama Levi, 2007 — Peru, Bolivia, Brazil
 Mangora argenteostriata Simon, 1897 — Brazil
 Mangora aripeba Levi, 2007 — Brazil
 Mangora aripuana Levi, 2007 — Brazil
 Mangora asis Levi, 2007 — Colombia
 Mangora ayo Levi, 2007 — Colombia
 Mangora balbina Levi, 2007 — Brazil
 Mangora bambusa Levi, 2007 — Colombia
 Mangora barba Levi, 2007 — Colombia
 Mangora bemberg Levi, 2007 — Brazil, Argentina
 Mangora bimaculata (O. P.-Cambridge, 1889) — Mexico to Costa Rica
 Mangora blumenau Levi, 2007 — Brazil
 Mangora bocaina Levi, 2007 — Brazil
 Mangora bonaldoi Levi, 2007 — Brazil
 Mangora botelho Levi, 2007 — Brazil
 Mangora bovis Levi, 2007 — Brazil, Guyana
 Mangora boyaca Levi, 2007 — Colombia
 Mangora brokopondo Levi, 2007 — Brazil, Guyana, Suriname, French Guiana
 Mangora browns Levi, 2007 — Suriname
 Mangora caballero Levi, 2007 — Brazil, Argentina
 Mangora cajuta Levi, 2007 — Bolivia
 Mangora calcarifera F. O. P.-Cambridge, 1904 — USA to Costa Rica
 Mangora campeche Levi, 2005 — Mexico
 Mangora candida Chickering, 1954 — Panama
 Mangora caparu Levi, 2007 — Colombia
 Mangora castelo Levi, 2007 — Brazil
 Mangora caxias Levi, 2007 — Brazil, Argentina
 Mangora cercado Levi, 2007 — Brazil
 Mangora chacobo Levi, 2007 — Peru, Bolivia, Brazil
 Mangora chanchamayo Levi, 2007 — Peru
 Mangora chao Levi, 2007 — Brazil, Paraguay
 Mangora chavantina Levi, 2007 — Brazil, French Guiana
 Mangora chicanna Levi, 2005 — Mexico to Honduras
 Mangora chiguaza Levi, 2007 — Ecuador, Peru
 Mangora chispa Levi, 2007 — Peru
 Mangora chuquisaca Levi, 2007 — Bolivia, Argentina
 Mangora cochuna Levi, 2007 — Peru, Argentina
 Mangora colonche Levi, 2007 — Peru, Ecuador
 Mangora comaina Levi, 2007 — Peru
 Mangora corcovado Levi, 2005 — Costa Rica
 Mangora corocito Levi, 2007 — Venezuela, French Guiana
 Mangora craigae Levi, 2005 — Costa Rica
 Mangora crescopicta Yin et al., 1990 — China
 Mangora cutucu Levi, 2007 — Ecuador
 Mangora dagua Levi, 2007 — Colombia
 Mangora dianasilvae Levi, 2007 — Colombia, Venezuela, Trinidad, Peru, Bolivia, Brazil
 Mangora distincta Chickering, 1963 — Honduras to Costa Rica
 Mangora divisor Levi, 2007 — Brazil
 Mangora eberhardi Levi, 2007 — Colombia
 Mangora engleri Levi, 2007 — Ecuador
 Mangora enseada Levi, 2007 — Brazil, Argentina
 Mangora explorama Levi, 2007 — Peru
 Mangora falconae Schenkel, 1953 — Panama, Colombia, Venezuela
 Mangora fascialata Franganillo, 1936 — USA to Honduras, Cuba, Hispaniola, Trinidad
 Mangora florestal Levi, 2007 — Brazil
 Mangora foliosa Zhu & Yin, 1998 — China
 Mangora fornicata (Keyserling, 1864) — Colombia
 Mangora fortuna Levi, 2005 — Costa Rica, Panama
 Mangora fundo Levi, 2007 — Brazil
 Mangora gibberosa (Hentz, 1847) — North America
 Mangora goodnightorum Levi, 2005 — Mexico
 Mangora grande Levi, 2007 — Venezuela
 Mangora hemicraera (Thorell, 1890) — Malaysia
 Mangora herbeoides (Bösenberg & Strand, 1906) — China, Korea, Japan
 Mangora hirtipes (Taczanowski, 1878) — Peru, Brazil, Guyana, French Guiana
 Mangora huallaga Levi, 2007 — Peru, Bolivia
 Mangora huancabamba Levi, 2007 — Peru
 Mangora ikuruwa Levi, 2007 — Venezuela, Guyana, French Guiana, Peru
 Mangora inconspicua Schenkel, 1936 — China
 Mangora insperata Soares & Camargo, 1948 — Colombia, Peru, Brazil
 Mangora isabel Levi, 2007 — Brazil, French Guiana
 Mangora itabapuana Levi, 2007 — Brazil
 Mangora itatiaia Levi, 2007 — Brazil
 Mangora itza Levi, 2005 — Mexico
 Mangora ixtapan Levi, 2005 — Mexico
 Mangora jumboe Levi, 2007 — Ecuador
 Mangora keduc Levi, 2007 — Brazil
 Mangora kochalkai Levi, 2007 — Colombia
 Mangora kuntur Levi, 2007 — Peru
 Mangora lactea Mello-Leitao, 1944 — Bolivia, Brazil, Argentina
 Mangora laga Levi, 2007 — Peru
 Mangora latica Levi, 2007 — Colombia
 Mangora lechugal Levi, 2007 — Peru, Ecuador
 Mangora leticia Levi, 2007 — Colombia
 Mangora leucogasteroides Roewer, 1955 — Myanmar
 Mangora leverger Levi, 2007 — Brazil, Paraguay
 Mangora logrono Levi, 2007 — Ecuador
 Mangora maculata (Keyserling, 1865) — USA
 Mangora mamiraua Levi, 2007 — Brazil
 Mangora manglar Levi, 2007 — Ecuador
 Mangora manicore Levi, 2007 — Brazil
 Mangora mapia Levi, 2007 — Brazil
 Mangora matamata Levi, 2007 — Colombia
 Mangora mathani Simon, 1895 — Colombia, Peru, Ecuador, Brazil
 Mangora maximiano Levi, 2007 — Brazil
 Mangora melanocephala (Taczanowski, 1874) — Mexico to Argentina
 Mangora melanoleuca Mello-Leitao, 1941 — Argentina
 Mangora melloleitaoi Levi, 2007 — Brazil
 Mangora minacu Levi, 2007 — Brazil
 Mangora missa Levi, 2007 — Brazil, Argentina
 Mangora mitu Levi, 2007 — Colombia
 Mangora mobilis (O. P.-Cambridge, 1889) — Mexico to Honduras
 Mangora montana Chickering, 1954 — Costa Rica, Panama
 Mangora morona Levi, 2007 — Ecuador, Brazil
 Mangora moyobamba Levi, 2007 — Peru
 Mangora nahuatl Levi, 2005 — Mexico
 Mangora nonoai Levi, 2007 — Brazil
 Mangora novempupillata Mello-Leitao, 1940 — Colombia, Peru, Bolivia, Brazil
 Mangora nuco Levi, 2007 — Peru
 Mangora oaxaca Levi, 2005 — Mexico
 Mangora ordaz Levi, 2007 — Venezuela
 Mangora ouropreto Santos & Santos, 2011 — Brazil
 Mangora oxapampa Levi, 2007 — Peru
 Mangora pagoreni Levi, 2007 — Peru
 Mangora palenque Levi, 2007 — Ecuador
 Mangora paranaiba Levi, 2007 — Brazil
 Mangora passiva (O. P.-Cambridge, 1889) — USA to Nicaragua
 Mangora paula Levi, 2007 — Brazil
 Mangora peichiuta Levi, 2007 — Paraguay
 Mangora pepino Levi, 2007 — Colombia
 Mangora pia Chamberlin & Ivie, 1936 — Panama, Colombia, Venezuela, Brazil
 Mangora picta O. P.-Cambridge, 1889 (type species) — Mexico to Honduras
 Mangora pira Levi, 2007 — Colombia
 Mangora piratini Rodrigues & Mendonça, 2011 — Brazil
 Mangora piroca Levi, 2007 — Brazil
 Mangora placida (Hentz, 1847) — North America
 Mangora polypicula Yin et al., 1990 — China
 Mangora porcullo Levi, 2007 — Peru
 Mangora puerto Levi, 2007 — Peru
 Mangora punctipes (Taczanowski, 1878) — Peru
 Mangora purulha Levi, 2005 — Guatemala
 Mangora ramirezi Levi, 2007 — Brazil, Argentina
 Mangora rhombopicta Yin et al., 1990 — China
 Mangora rondonia Levi, 2007 — Brazil
 Mangora rupununi Levi, 2007 — Guyana
 Mangora saut Levi, 2007 — French Guiana
 Mangora schneirlai Chickering, 1954 — Costa Rica, Panama
 Mangora sciosciae Levi, 2007 — Argentina
 Mangora semiargentea Simon, 1895 — Sri Lanka
 Mangora semiatra Levi, 2007 — Colombia, Venezuela, Peru
 Mangora shudikar Levi, 2007 — Guyana
 Mangora sobradinho Levi, 2007 — Brazil
 Mangora socorpa Levi, 2007 — Colombia
 Mangora songyangensis Yin et al., 1990 — China
 Mangora spiculata (Hentz, 1847) — USA, China
 Mangora strenua (Keyserling, 1893) — Brazil, Argentina
 Mangora sturmi Levi, 2007 — Colombia
 Mangora sufflava Chickering, 1963 — Panama
 Mangora sumauma Levi, 2007 — Brazil
 Mangora taboquinha Levi, 2007 — Brazil
 Mangora taczanowskii Levi, 2007 — Peru
 Mangora tambo Levi, 2007 — Peru
 Mangora taraira Levi, 2007 — Colombia
 Mangora tarapuy Levi, 2007 — Ecuador, Brazil
 Mangora tarma Levi, 2007 — Peru
 Mangora tefe Levi, 2007 — Colombia, Ecuador, Brazil
 Mangora theridioides Mello-Leitao, 1948 — Guyana
 Mangora tschekiangensis Schenkel, 1963 — China
 Mangora umbrata Simon, 1897 — Peru
 Mangora unam Levi, 2007 — Colombia, Peru, Brazil
 Mangora uraricoera Levi, 2007 — Colombia, Venezuela, Peru, Ecuador, Brazil, Guyana, Suriname, French Guiana
 Mangora uru Levi, 2007 — Peru
 Mangora uziga Levi, 2007 — Paraguay, Argentina
 Mangora v-signata Mello-Leitao, 1943 — Bolivia, Brazil, Argentina
 Mangora vaupes Levi, 2007 — Colombia
 Mangora velha Levi, 2007 — Brazil
 Mangora vianai Levi, 2007 — Argentina
 Mangora villeta Levi, 2007 — Colombia
 Mangora vito Levi, 2005 — Costa Rica
 Mangora volcan Levi, 2005 — Panama
 Mangora yacupoi Levi, 2007 — Argentina
 Mangora yungas Levi, 2007 — Argentina
 Mangora zepol Levi, 2007 — Colombia
 Mangora zona Levi, 2007 — Peru

Manogea
Manogea Levi, 1997
 Manogea gaira Levi, 1997 — Colombia, Venezuela
 Manogea porracea (C. L. Koch, 1838) (type species) — Panama to Argentina
 Manogea triforma Levi, 1997 — Mexico, Guatemala, Honduras

Mastophora
Mastophora Holmberg, 1876
 Mastophora abalosi Urtubey & Baez, 1983 — Argentina
 Mastophora alachua Levi, 2003 — USA
 Mastophora alvareztoroi Ibarra & Jimenez, 2003 — USA, Mexico
 Mastophora apalachicola Levi, 2003 — USA
 Mastophora archeri Gertsch, 1955 — USA
 Mastophora bisaccata (Emerton, 1884) — USA, Mexico
 Mastophora brescoviti Levi, 2003 — Brazil
 Mastophora caesariata Eberhard & Levi, 2006 — Costa Rica
 Mastophora carpogaster Mello-Leitao, 1925 — Brazil
 Mastophora catarina Levi, 2003 — Brazil
 Mastophora comma Baez & Urtubey, 1985 — Argentina
 Mastophora conica Levi, 2006 — Argentina
 Mastophora conifera (Holmberg, 1876) — Argentina
 Mastophora cornigera (Hentz, 1850) — USA to Nicaragua
 Mastophora corpulenta (Banks, 1898) — Mexico, Honduras, Nicaragua, Brazil
 Mastophora corumbatai Levi, 2003 — Brazil
 Mastophora cranion Mello-Leitao, 1928 — Brazil
 Mastophora diablo Levi, 2003 — Argentina
 Mastophora dizzydeani Eberhard, 1981 — Colombia, Peru
 Mastophora escomeli Levi, 2003 — Peru
 Mastophora extraordinaria Holmberg, 1876 (type species) — Brazil, Uruguay, Argentina
 Mastophora fasciata Reimoser, 1939 — Costa Rica, Venezuela
 Mastophora felda Levi, 2003 — USA
 Mastophora felis Piza, 1976 — Brazil
 Mastophora gasteracanthoides (Nicolet, 1849) — Chile
 Mastophora haywardi Biraben, 1946 — Argentina
 Mastophora holmbergi Canals, 1931 — Paraguay, Argentina
 Mastophora hutchinsoni Gertsch, 1955 — USA, Canada
 Mastophora lara Levi, 2003 — Venezuela
 Mastophora leucabulba (Gertsch, 1955) — USA to Honduras
 Mastophora leucacantha (Simon, 1897) — Brazil
 Mastophora longiceps Mello-Leitao, 1940 — Brazil
 Mastophora melloleitaoi Canals, 1931 — Brazil, Argentina
 Mastophora obtusa Mello-Leitao, 1936 — Brazil
 Mastophora pesqueiro Levi, 2003 — Brazil
 Mastophora phrynosoma Gertsch, 1955 — USA
 Mastophora pickeli Mello-Leitao, 1931 — Brazil
 Mastophora piras Levi, 2003 — Brazil
 Mastophora rabida Levi, 2003 — Galapagos Islands
 Mastophora reimoseri Levi, 2003 — Paraguay
 Mastophora satan Canals, 1931 — Brazil, Uruguay, Argentina
 Mastophora satsuma Levi, 2003 — USA
 Mastophora seminole Levi, 2003 — USA
 Mastophora soberiana Levi, 2003 — Panama
 Mastophora stowei Levi, 2003 — USA
 Mastophora timuqua Levi, 2003 — USA
 Mastophora vaquera Gertsch, 1955 — Cuba
 Mastophora yacare Levi, 2003 — Uruguay
 Mastophora yeargani Levi, 2003 — USA
 Mastophora ypiranga Levi, 2003 — Brazil

Mecynogea
Mecynogea Simon, 1903
 Mecynogea apatzingan Levi, 1997 — Mexico
 Mecynogea bigibba Simon, 1903 (type species) — Brazil, Uruguay
 Mecynogea buique Levi, 1997 — Brazil
 Mecynogea chavona Levi, 1997 — Colombia
 Mecynogea erythromela (Holmberg, 1876) — Brazil, Paraguay, Argentina, Chile
 Mecynogea lemniscata (Walckenaer, 1841) — USA to Argentina
 Mecynogea martiana (Archer, 1958) — Cuba, Hispaniola
 Mecynogea ocosingo Levi, 1997 — Mexico
 Mecynogea sucre Levi, 1997 — Venezuela, Brazil

Megaraneus
Megaraneus Lawrence, 1968
 Megaraneus gabonensis (Lucas, 1858) — Africa

Melychiopharis
Melychiopharis Simon, 1895
 Melychiopharis bibendum Brescovit, Santos & Leite, 2011 — Brazil
 Melychiopharis cynips Simon, 1895 (type species) — Brazil

Metazygia
Metazygia F. O. P.-Cambridge, 1904
 Metazygia adisi Levi, 1995 — Brazil
 Metazygia aldela Levi, 1995 — Brazil
 Metazygia amalla Levi, 1995 — Brazil
 Metazygia arnoi Levi, 1995 — Brazil
 Metazygia atalaya Levi, 1995 — Peru
 Metazygia atama Levi, 1995 — Brazil
 Metazygia bahama Levi, 1995 — Bahama Islands
 Metazygia bahia Levi, 1995 — Brazil
 Metazygia barueri Levi, 1995 — Brazil
 Metazygia benella Levi, 1995 — Panama, Colombia
 Metazygia bolivia Levi, 1995 — Bolivia
 Metazygia calix (Walckenaer, 1841) — USA
 Metazygia carimagua Levi, 1995 — Colombia
 Metazygia carolinalis (Archer, 1951) — USA
 Metazygia carrizal Levi, 1995 — Guatemala
 Metazygia castaneoscutata (Simon, 1895) — Peru, Brazil
 Metazygia cazeaca Levi, 1995 — Brazil
 Metazygia chenevo Levi, 1995 — Colombia, Guyana
 Metazygia chicanna Levi, 1995 — Mexico, Belize, Honduras, Jamaica
 Metazygia cienaga Levi, 1995 — Hispaniola
 Metazygia corima Levi, 1995 — Colombia
 Metazygia corumba Levi, 1995 — Bolivia, Brazil
 Metazygia crabroniphila Strand, 1916 — Brazil
 Metazygia crewi (Banks, 1903) — Greater Antilles, Virgin Islands
 Metazygia cunha Levi, 1995 — Brazil
 Metazygia curari Levi, 1995 — Brazil
 Metazygia dubia (Keyserling, 1864) — Costa Rica, Cuba to Galapagos Islands, Peru, Brazil
 Metazygia ducke Levi, 1995 — Brazil, Bolivia
 Metazygia enabla Levi, 1995 — Colombia, Venezuela
 Metazygia erratica (Keyserling, 1883) — Brazil
 Metazygia floresta Levi, 1995 — Brazil
 Metazygia genaro Levi, 1995 — Peru
 Metazygia genialis (Keyserling, 1892) — Brazil
 Metazygia goeldii Levi, 1995 — French Guiana, Brazil
 Metazygia gregalis (O. P.-Cambridge, 1889) — Nicaragua, West Indies to Argentina
 Metazygia ikuruwa Levi, 1995 — Guyana
 Metazygia incerta (O. P.-Cambridge, 1889) — Belize to Panama
 Metazygia ipago Levi, 1995 — Brazil
 Metazygia ipanga Levi, 1995 — Bolivia, Brazil, Argentina
 Metazygia isabelae Levi, 1995 — Brazil
 Metazygia ituari Levi, 1995 — Brazil
 Metazygia jamari Levi, 1995 — Brazil, Suriname
 Metazygia keyserlingi Banks, 1929 — Costa Rica, Panama, Colombia, Trinidad
 Metazygia lagiana Levi, 1995 — Peru, Brazil, Bolivia, Argentina
 Metazygia laticeps (O. P.-Cambridge, 1889) — Guatemala to Bolivia, Brazil
 Metazygia lazepa Levi, 1995 — Colombia, Venezuela
 Metazygia levii Santos, 2003 — Brazil
 Metazygia limonal Levi, 1995 — Peru, Brazil, Argentina
 Metazygia lopez Levi, 1995 — Colombia, Venezuela, Peru, Brazil
 Metazygia loque Levi, 1995 — Bolivia
 Metazygia manu Levi, 1995 — Peru, French Guiana
 Metazygia mariahelenae Levi, 1995 — Brazil
 Metazygia matanzas Levi, 1995 — Cuba
 Metazygia moldira Levi, 1995 — Ecuador, Peru
 Metazygia mundulella (Strand, 1916) — Brazil
 Metazygia nigrocincta (F. O. P.-Cambridge, 1904) — Mexico to Panama
 Metazygia nobas Levi, 1995 — Ecuador
 Metazygia octama Levi, 1995 — Panama to Peru
 Metazygia oro Levi, 1995 — Ecuador
 Metazygia pallidula (Keyserling, 1864) — Mexico to Peru
 Metazygia paquisha Levi, 1995 — Venezuela, Peru
 Metazygia pastaza Levi, 1995 — Peru
 Metazygia patiama Levi, 1995 — Peru, Brazil
 Metazygia peckorum Levi, 1995 — Colombia, Ecuador, Peru, Brazil
 Metazygia pimentel Levi, 1995 — Venezuela, Peru
 Metazygia redfordi Levi, 1995 — Brazil
 Metazygia rogenhoferi (Keyserling, 1878) — Brazil
 Metazygia rothi Levi, 1995 — Colombia
 Metazygia samiria Levi, 1995 — Peru
 Metazygia saturnino Levi, 1995 — Brazil
 Metazygia sendero Levi, 1995 — Colombia, Ecuador, Peru
 Metazygia serian Levi, 1995 — Costa Rica
 Metazygia silvestris (Bryant, 1942) — Puerto Rico
 Metazygia souza Levi, 1995 — Brazil
 Metazygia taman Levi, 1995 — Mexico
 Metazygia tanica Levi, 1995 — Guyana, French Guiana
 Metazygia tapa Levi, 1995 — Colombia, Peru, French Guiana
 Metazygia uma Levi, 1995 — Colombia, Peru, Brazil
 Metazygia uraricoera Levi, 1995 — Brazil, Guyana, Suriname
 Metazygia uratron Levi, 1995 — Brazil
 Metazygia valentim Levi, 1995 — Brazil
 Metazygia vaupes Levi, 1995 — Colombia, Peru, Brazil
 Metazygia vaurieorum Levi, 1995 — Guatemala
 Metazygia viriosa (Keyserling, 1892) — Brazil
 Metazygia voluptifica (Keyserling, 1892) — Colombia to Argentina
 Metazygia voxanta Levi, 1995 — Brazil
 Metazygia wittfeldae (McCook, 1894) (type species) — USA to Costa Rica
 Metazygia yobena Levi, 1995 — Colombia to Guyana, Bolivia
 Metazygia yucumo Levi, 1995 — Colombia, Peru, Bolivia, French Guiana
 Metazygia zilloides (Banks, 1898) — USA, West Indies to Honduras

Metepeira
Metepeira F. O. P.-Cambridge, 1903
 Metepeira arizonica Chamberlin & Ivie, 1942 — USA, Mexico
 Metepeira atascadero Piel, 2001 — Mexico
 Metepeira bengryi (Archer, 1958) — Jamaica
 Metepeira brunneiceps Caporiacco, 1954 — French Guiana
 Metepeira cajabamba Piel, 2001 — Ecuador, Peru
 Metepeira calamuchita Piel, 2001 — Argentina
 Metepeira celestun Piel, 2001 — Mexico
 Metepeira chilapae Chamberlin & Ivie, 1936 — Mexico
 Metepeira comanche Levi, 1977 — USA, Mexico
 Metepeira compsa (Chamberlin, 1916) — Puerto Rico to Argentina
 Metepeira crassipes Chamberlin & Ivie, 1942 — USA, Mexico
 Metepeira datona Chamberlin & Ivie, 1942 — USA, Greater Antilles
 Metepeira desenderi Baert, 1987 — Galapagos Islands
 Metepeira foxi Gertsch & Ivie, 1936 — USA, Canada
 Metepeira galatheae (Thorell, 1891) — Chile, Argentina
 Metepeira glomerabilis (Keyserling, 1892) — Colombia to Paraguay, Brazil
 Metepeira gosoga Chamberlin & Ivie, 1935 — USA, Mexico
 Metepeira grandiosa Chamberlin & Ivie, 1941 — North America
 Metepeira gressa (Keyserling, 1892) — Brazil, Paraguay, Uruguay, Argentina
 Metepeira inca Piel, 2001 — Peru
 Metepeira incrassata F. O. P.-Cambridge, 1903 — Mexico
 Metepeira jamaicensis Archer, 1958 — Hispaniola, Jamaica, Grand Cayman Islands
 Metepeira karkii (Tullgren, 1901) — Chile, Argentina
 Metepeira labyrinthea (Hentz, 1847) — North America
 Metepeira lacandon Piel, 2001 — Mexico
 Metepeira lima Chamberlin & Ivie, 1942 — Peru
 Metepeira maya Piel, 2001 — Mexico to Costa Rica
 Metepeira minima Gertsch, 1936 — USA to Honduras
 Metepeira nigriventris (Taczanowski, 1878) — Peru, Bolivia
 Metepeira olmec Piel, 2001 — Mexico to Panama
 Metepeira pacifica Piel, 2001 — Honduras, Nicaragua, Costa Rica
 Metepeira palustris Chamberlin & Ivie, 1942 — USA, Canada
 Metepeira petatlan Piel, 2001 — Mexico
 Metepeira pimungan Piel, 2001 — USA
 Metepeira rectangula (Nicolet, 1849) — Chile, Argentina
 Metepeira revillagigedo Piel, 2001 — Mexico
 Metepeira roraima Piel, 2001 — Colombia, Brazil, Guyana
 Metepeira spinipes F. O. P.-Cambridge, 1903 (type species) — USA, Mexico
 Metepeira tarapaca Piel, 2001 — Peru, Chile
 Metepeira triangularis (Franganillo, 1930) — Cuba, Hispaniola
 Metepeira uncata F. O. P.-Cambridge, 1903 — Guatemala to Costa Rica
 Metepeira ventura Chamberlin & Ivie, 1942 — USA, Mexico
 Metepeira vigilax (Keyserling, 1893) — Hispaniola, Bolivia, Brazil, Argentina
 Metepeira ypsilonota Mello-Leitao, 1940 — Brazil

Micrathena
Micrathena Sundevall, 1833
 Micrathena abrahami (Mello-Leitao, 1948) — Colombia to Brazil
 Micrathena acuta (Walckenaer, 1841) — Trinidad to Argentina
 Micrathena agriliformis (Taczanowski, 1879) — Costa Rica to Bolivia
 Micrathena alvarengai Levi, 1985 — Brazil
 Micrathena anchicaya Levi, 1985 — Colombia, Ecuador
 Micrathena annulata Reimoser, 1917 — Colombia, Brazil, Paraguay
 Micrathena armigera (C. L. Koch, 1837) — Brazil, Peru, Guyana
 Micrathena atuncela Levi, 1985 — Colombia
 Micrathena aureola (C. L. Koch, 1836) — Colombia to Suriname, Paraguay
 Micrathena balzapamba Levi, 1985 — Ecuador
 Micrathena bananal Levi, 1985 — Brazil
 Micrathena bandeirante (Magalhaes & Santos, 2011) — Brazil
 Micrathena banksi Levi, 1985 — Cuba
 Micrathena beta Caporiacco, 1947 — Guyana
 Micrathena bicolor (Keyserling, 1864) — Colombia, Peru
 Micrathena bifida (Taczanowski, 1879) — Peru
 Micrathena bimucronata (O. P.-Cambridge, 1899) — Mexico to Panama
 Micrathena bogota Levi, 1985 — Colombia
 Micrathena brevipes (O. P.-Cambridge, 1890) — Mexico to Panama
 Micrathena brevispina (Keyserling, 1864) — Panama to Argentina
 Micrathena carimagua (Levi, 1985) — Colombia, Venezuela
 Micrathena clypeata (Walckenaer, 1805) (type species) — Panama to Peru
 Micrathena coca Levi, 1985 — Colombia to Brazil
 Micrathena cornuta (Taczanowski, 1873) — Colombia to Brazil
 Micrathena coroico Levi, 1985 — Bolivia
 Micrathena crassa (Keyserling, 1864) — Costa Rica to Argentina
 Micrathena crassispina (C. L. Koch, 1836) — Brazil, Bolivia, Paraguay, Argentina
 Micrathena cubana (Banks, 1909) — Cuba
 Micrathena cucharas (Levi, 1985) — Peru
 Micrathena cyanospina (Lucas, 1835) — Colombia to Brazil
 Micrathena decorata Chickering, 1960 — Colombia
 Micrathena digitata (C. L. Koch, 1839) — Brazil
 Micrathena donaldi Chickering, 1961 — Costa Rica to Colombia
 Micrathena duodecimspinosa (O. P.-Cambridge, 1890) — Guatemala to Colombia
 Micrathena elongata (Keyserling, 1864) — Colombia
 Micrathena embira Levi, 1985 — Colombia, Brazil
 Micrathena evansi Chickering, 1960 — Panama, Trinidad to Brazil
 Micrathena excavata (C. L. Koch, 1836) — Panama to Brazil
 Micrathena exlinae Levi, 1985 — Peru
 Micrathena fidelis (Banks, 1909) — Costa Rica to Argentina
 Micrathena fissispina (C. L. Koch, 1836) — Brazil, French Guiana
 Micrathena flaveola (Perty, 1839) — Costa Rica to Argentina
 Micrathena forcipata (Thorell, 1859) — Mexico, Cuba, Hispaniola
 Micrathena forcipata argentata Franganillo, 1930 — Cuba
 Micrathena funebris (Marx, 1898) — USA to Costa Rica
 Micrathena furcata (Hahn, 1822) — Brazil, Argentina, Uruguay
 Micrathena furcula (O. P.-Cambridge, 1890) — Guatemala to Brazil
 Micrathena furva (Keyserling, 1892) — Brazil, Uruguay, Argentina
 Micrathena gaujoni Simon, 1897 — Ecuador, Colombia
 Micrathena glyptogonoides Levi, 1985 — Mexico
 Micrathena gracilis (Walckenaer, 1805) — North, Central America
 Micrathena guayas Levi, 1985 — Ecuador
 Micrathena guerini (Keyserling, 1864) — Colombia
 Micrathena gurupi Levi, 1985 — Brazil, Suriname
 Micrathena hamifera Simon, 1897 — Ecuador to Brazil
 Micrathena horrida (Taczanowski, 1873) — Greater Antilles, Mexico to Argentina
 Micrathena horrida tuberculata Franganillo, 1930 — Cuba
 Micrathena huanuco Levi, 1985 — Colombia, Peru
 Micrathena jundiai Levi, 1985 — Brazil
 Micrathena kirbyi (Perty, 1833) — Colombia to Brazil
 Micrathena kochalkai Levi, 1985 — Colombia
 Micrathena lata Chickering, 1960 — French Guiana, Brazil
 Micrathena lenca Levi, 1985 — Mexico
 Micrathena lepidoptera Mello-Leitao, 1941 — Costa Rica to Colombia
 Micrathena lindenbergi Mello-Leitao, 1940 — Brazil
 Micrathena lucasi (Keyserling, 1864) — Mexico to Brazil
 Micrathena macfarlanei Chickering, 1961 — Panama to Brazil
 Micrathena margerita Levi, 1985 — Mexico
 Micrathena marta Levi, 1985 — Colombia
 Micrathena miles Simon, 1895 — Brazil, Guyana, Peru
 Micrathena militaris (Fabricius, 1775) — Greater Antilles
 Micrathena mitrata (Hentz, 1850) — USA to Brazil
 Micrathena molesta Chickering, 1961 — Nicaragua to Panama
 Micrathena necopinata Chickering, 1960 — Colombia, Peru, Brazil
 Micrathena nigrichelis Strand, 1908 — Brazil, Paraguay, Uruguay, Argentina
 Micrathena osa (Levi, 1985) — Costa Rica
 Micrathena parallela (O. P.-Cambridge, 1890) — Costa Rica, Panama
 Micrathena patruelis (C. L. Koch, 1839) — Brazil, Paraguay, Argentina
 Micrathena peregrinatorum (Holmberg, 1883) — Brazil, Argentina
 Micrathena petrunkevitchi Levi, 1985 — Mexico
 Micrathena pichincha Levi, 1985 — Ecuador
 Micrathena picta (C. L. Koch, 1836) — Guyana to Paraguay
 Micrathena pilaton Levi, 1985 — Ecuador
 Micrathena plana (C. L. Koch, 1836) — Virgin Islands to Argentina
 Micrathena pungens (Walckenaer, 1841) — Colombia to Bolivia
 Micrathena pupa Simon, 1897 — Colombia, Ecuador
 Micrathena quadriserrata F. O. P.-Cambridge, 1904 — Mexico to Venezuela
 Micrathena raimondi (Taczanowski, 1879) — Peru, Ecuador
 Micrathena reali Levi, 1985 — Brazil
 Micrathena reimoseri Mello-Leitao, 1935 — Brazil
 Micrathena rubicundula (Keyserling, 1864) — Colombia, Ecuador
 Micrathena rufopunctata (Butler, 1873) — Jamaica
 Micrathena ruschii (Mello-Leitao, 1945) — Brazil
 Micrathena saccata (C. L. Koch, 1836) — Honduras to Brazil
 Micrathena sagittata (Walckenaer, 1841) — North, Central America
 Micrathena sanctispiritus Brignoli, 1983 — Brazil
 Micrathena schenkeli Mello-Leitao, 1939 — Trinidad to Paraguay
 Micrathena schreibersi (Perty, 1833) — Nicaragua to Brazil
 Micrathena sexspinosa (Hahn, 1822) — Mexico to Brazil
 Micrathena shealsi Chickering, 1960 — Argentina
 Micrathena similis Bryant, 1945 — Hispaniola
 Micrathena soaresi Levi, 1985 — Brazil
 Micrathena spinosa (Linnaeus, 1758) — Suriname, French Guiana, Brazil
 Micrathena spinulata F. O. P.-Cambridge, 1904 — Mexico
 Micrathena spitzi Mello-Leitao, 1932 — Brazil, Argentina
 Micrathena striata F. O. P.-Cambridge, 1904 — Mexico, Guatemala
 Micrathena stuebeli (Karsch, 1886) — Colombia, Ecuador
 Micrathena swainsoni (Perty, 1833) — Brazil, Paraguay, Argentina
 Micrathena teresopolis Levi, 1985 — Brazil
 Micrathena triangularis (C. L. Koch, 1836) — Trinidad to Brazil
 Micrathena triangularispinosa (De Geer, 1778) — Trinidad to Bolivia
 Micrathena triserrata F. O. P.-Cambridge, 1904 — Mexico to Belize
 Micrathena tziscao Levi, 1985 — Mexico
 Micrathena ucayali Levi, 1985 — Peru, Brazil
 Micrathena vigorsi (Perty, 1833) — Colombia to Brazil
 Micrathena woytkowskii (Levi, 1985) — Peru
 Micrathena yanomami Magalhaes & Santos, 2011 — Brazil
 Micrathena zilchi Kraus, 1955 — Mexico to El Salvador

Micrepeira
Micrepeira Schenkel, 1953
 Micrepeira albomaculata Schenkel, 1953 (type species) — Venezuela
 Micrepeira fowleri Levi, 1995 — Colombia, Ecuador, Peru, Brazil
 Micrepeira hoeferi Levi, 1995 — Peru, Brazil, French Guiana
 Micrepeira pachitea Levi, 1995 — Peru
 Micrepeira smithae Levi, 1995 — Suriname
 Micrepeira tubulofaciens (Hingston, 1932) — Colombia, Guyana, French Guiana
 Micrepeira velso Levi, 1995 — Costa Rica

Micropoltys
Micropoltys Kulczynski, 1911
 Micropoltys baitetensis Smith & Levi, 2010 — New Guinea
 Micropoltys debakkeri Smith & Levi, 2010 — New Guinea, Queensland
 Micropoltys heatherae Smith & Levi, 2010 — Queensland
 Micropoltys placenta Kulczynski, 1911 (type species) — New Guinea

Milonia
Milonia Thorell, 1890
 Milonia albula O. P.-Cambridge, 1899 — Singapore
 Milonia brevipes Thorell, 1890 (type species) — Sumatra
 Milonia hexastigma (Hasselt, 1882) — Sumatra
 Milonia obtusa Thorell, 1892 — Singapore
 Milonia singaeformis (Hasselt, 1882) — Sumatra
 Milonia tomosceles Thorell, 1895 — Myanmar
 Milonia trifasciata Thorell, 1890 — Java, Borneo

Molinaranea
Molinaranea Mello-Leitao, 1940
 Molinaranea clymene (Nicolet, 1849) — Chile, Argentina
 Molinaranea fernandez Levi, 2001 — Juan Fernandez Islands
 Molinaranea magellanica (Walckenaer, 1847) (type species) — Chile, Argentina, Juan Fernandez Islands, Falkland Islands
 Molinaranea mammifera (Tullgren, 1902) — Chile
 Molinaranea phaethontis (Simon, 1896) — Chile, Argentina
 Molinaranea surculorum (Simon, 1896) — Chile
 Molinaranea vildav Levi, 2001 — Chile

References
  (2014): The world spider catalog, version 14.5. American Museum of Natural History. 

Lists of spider species by family